Will Saul (born 28 December 1978 in Glastonbury, England) is a British DJ, music producer, and the founder of Simple Records and Aus Music.

Career
Will Saul started his first record label, Simple Records in 2003, after having worked at Sony International’s A&R department for two years. It was when subsequently working for Koobla Records and then Phonica that he had his eyes fully opened to the wonderful world of house and techno. Simple Records is one of the leading lights of the more melodic side of house music – releasing music from the label’s core artists (Saul, Sideshow) as well as Vector Lovers, Marc Romboy, and Motorcitysoul.

February 2005 saw the release of Simple One, a compilation that encapsulates the labels sound – edgy and deep but tuneful and organic. In the early summer of the same year, Saul followed with the release of his debut artist album Space Between, a soulful and melodic journey geared towards home listening rather than the dancefloor.

Saul started Aus Music in 2006 with Sideshow (Fink on Ninja Tune). The label explores the more leftfield and experimental side of house, techno, dub and downtempo, with releases from cutting edge artists such as Motorcitysoul, Lee Jones, Martyn, Appleblim, Ramadanman, Joy Orbison, Shur-I-Kan and Midland.

Over the last few years, Saul has gained an admirable reputation as not only a DJ but also a talented A&R producer, thus in 2009, Saul released a three-disc contribution to EQ Recordings Balance series. Saul was also a resident at the London club The End for many years before it closed in January 2009. He contributed to BBC Radio 1's Essential Mix series on 27 April 2013.

Since 2015, Saul has served as A&R for !K7's DJ-Kicks series, beginning with Actress' entry to the series in May, and continuing with entries by DJ Koze, Seth Troxler, Moodymann, Dam-Funk, Jackmaster, Marcel Dettmann, and Daniel Avery that received praise from critics and audiences.

Discography

Original productions
Will Saul & Tam Cooper – "Hi-Lo / Room Inn Your Heart" (2011)
Will Saul & Mike Monday – "Sequence 1" EP – Aus Music (2010)
Will Saul Feat. Ursula Rucker – "Where Is It"’– Simple (2009)
Will Saul & Tam Cooper – "Through The Smoke" – Systematic (2009)
Will Saul & Tam Cooper – "In & Out/3000AD" – Simple (2009)
Will Saul & Mike Monday – "Zippo" – Buzzin’ Fly (2009)
Will Saul & Tam Cooper – "Teddy’s Back" – Simple (2009)
Will Saul & Tam Cooper – "Tech Noir" – Simple (2008)
Will Saul & Tam Cooper – "Sequential Circus" – Simple (2007)
Will Saul – "Pause" – Simple – (2007)
Will Saul & Lee Jones – "Hug The Sary" – Aus (2007)
Will Saul – "Where Is It" – Air 2006)
 Will Saul – "Jen" EP – Systematic (2006)
Will Saul – "Animal Magic" – Simple (2005)
Will Saul Featuring Ursula Rucker – "Tic Toc" – Simple (2005)
Will Saul – "Mbira" – Simple (2005)
Will Saul – "Space Between" (album) – Simple (2005)
Will Saul – "Malfunction" – Simple (2004)
Will Saul – "I Got Rhythm" – 10 Kilo (2004)
Will Saul – "Digital Watch" – Simple (2004)
Will Saul – "Cliff" – Simple (2003)
Will Saul – "Fast Lane" – Simple (2003)

Mix compilations
Will Saul – "Will Saul - DJ Kicks" – DJ Kicks (2014)
Will Saul – "Balance 015" – EQ Recordings (2009)
Will Saul/Various Artists – "All Night Long Mix" – Aus Music (2009)
Will Saul – "Simple One" – Simple (2005)
Will Saul – "Simple Sounds Vol 3" – Simple (2004)
Will Saul – "Simple Sounds Vol 2" – Simple (2003)
Will Saul versus Sideshow– "Simple Sounds Vol 1"– Simple (2003)

References

External links
 Soundcloud Page
 Simple Records Website
 Will Saul Artist Bio Page
 Aus Music Website

Club DJs
People from Glastonbury
1978 births
Living people
British DJs
Electronic dance music DJs